Albian Hajdari (born 18 May 2003) is a Swiss professional footballer who plays as defender for Swiss Super League club Lugano, on loan from Juventus.

Career
Hajdari first played for local club FC Aesch and moved to Basel's youth academy in 2014. He joined FC Basel's first team directly from their  U-18 team for their 2020–21 season under head coach Ciriaco Sforza. Somewhat surprising came the announcement on 19 September that Juventus had bought the rights of the young right back defender Hajdari. But Hajdari stayed with the squad, being loaned back to Basel for two seasons.

Hajdari played his professional debut for the club in the away game on 27 September as Basel were defeated 0–1 by Servette. The winning goal was scored from the penalty spot, the penalty was caused as the ball was headed from very close range onto Hajdari's upper right arm. On 15 July 2021, Juventus announced the termination of the loan one year early. However, he did not play any matches with the Juventus U-19. On 4 January 2022 he returned to the Swiss club on a six month loan.

During his time with Basel's first team, Hajdari played a total of 24 games for them scoring one goal. Nine of these games were in the Swiss Super League, and 15 were friendly games. He scored his only goal during the test game on 12 January 2022 as Basel beat Lugano 2–1. During his time on loan to Basel, Hajdari also had 5 appearances in their U-21 team in the third tier of Swiss football.

For the 2022–23 Swiss Super League season Hajdari was loaned to Lugano.

International career 
Born in Switzerland, Hajdari is of Kosovan descent. Hajdari was called up for the Swiss youth team and joined the Swiss U-18 on 1 July 2020.

References

Sources
 Verein "Basler Fussballarchiv" Homepage

External links
 SFV U16 Profile
 SFV U20 Profile

2003 births
Living people
Sportspeople from Basel-Landschaft
Swiss men's footballers
Switzerland youth international footballers
Swiss people of Kosovan descent
Juventus F.C. players
FC Basel players
FC Lugano players
Swiss Super League players
Association football defenders
Switzerland under-21 international footballers